Municipal College Rourkela is one of the oldest institution imparting +2, undergraduate degree (Arts, Commerce & Science) to students in western Odisha and around. The college laid its foundation in 1978 under Rourkela Education Development Society (REDS) which was due to patronage of the founding member A.J Alex (I.A.S ex ADM of Rourkela) and NAC(CT) Pitambar Mohanty OAS(I).

History
The college started its intermediate education in 1978, while that of undergraduate degree of commerce was introduced in 1980 along with BSc in 1981 and BA in 1985.

Municipal College is affiliated to Council of Higher Secondary Education, Odisha for +2 level and Sambalpur University for +3 level of undergraduate degrees.

Courses
Higher Secondary Education (Class 11 & Class 12/+2 Level):
Arts
Science
Commerce

Undergraduate degree (+3 Level):

B.A.
B.A. (Pass & Honours)
B.A. (Honours)
B.Sc
B.Sc (Pass & Honours)
B.Sc (Honours)
B.Com
B.Com (Pass & Honours)
B.Com (Honours)
 BBA

Activities

NCC includes two separate groups of boys and girls. The NCC (National Cadet Corps) is under 9th Odisha Battalion, which provides qualities of leadership, discipline in the students; they attend camps to improve their skills.

Youth Red Cross Unit is a group maintained by college students which maintains well-equipped first aid box and conducts blood donation and health check-up camps.
Cultural Associations students participate in debates, quizzes and essay competitions. It includes dramatics, athletics society which conducts programs.

References

External links
Website for Municipal College alumni

Department of Higher Education, Odisha
Universities and colleges in Rourkela
Colleges affiliated to Sambalpur University
Educational institutions established in 1978
1978 establishments in Orissa